Rose Hill is a historic tobacco plantation house and national historic district located near Grassy Creek, Granville County, North Carolina.  The house was built about 1834, and is a two-story, three bay by two bay, Greek Revival style red brick dwelling.  It has a low hipped roof and a Colonial Revival style front porch added in the late-19th or early-20th century.  Also on the property are the contributing garage, two frame corn cribs, four log tobacco barns, a log striphouse, a frame packhouse, and a tenant house.

It was listed on the National Register of Historic Places in 1988.

References

Tobacco plantations in the United States
Plantation houses in North Carolina
Farms on the National Register of Historic Places in North Carolina
Historic districts on the National Register of Historic Places in North Carolina
Greek Revival houses in North Carolina
Colonial Revival architecture in North Carolina
Houses completed in 1834
Houses in Granville County, North Carolina
National Register of Historic Places in Granville County, North Carolina